Michael Osei (born 15 September 1971) is a former Ghanaian professional footballer and coach who played as a midfielder and is currently the head coach of Bibiani Gold Stars. He is well known for playing for Asante Kotoko, SK Vorwärts Steyr in Austria and Mainz 05 in Germany. He also had spells with other clubs in Venezuela, Turkey and lower tier sides in Germany.

He is a former head coach of Asante Kotoko and Liberty Professionals. He is a frequent commentator on issues relating to sports in Ghana.

Club career

Early years and Asante Kotoko 
Born and bred in Asawase a suburb of Kumasi, Osei started his career with Suame-based Anokye Stars a colts football team, before joining Neoplan Stars, both in Kumasi. He moved to Nkawkaw-based club Okwawu United F.C. in the 1980s and played alongside his cousin Anthony Yeboah, he later moved to Kumasi Asante Kotoko in 1989. He won the Ghana Premier League twice during his stay with the club, in 1991 and 1992.

SK Vorwärts Steyr 
In the later part of 1992, Osei moved outside Ghana and signed for Austrian team SK Vorwärts Steyr. He played for the club for one season. He made his league debut on 15 March 1992 coming on as a substitute in the late minutes of a 1–0 win against FC Blau-Weiß Linz. He continued to play for club in the Austrian Bundesliga making five appearances in his debut season in the 1992–93 season and went on further to make eight appearances in the 1993–94 season, bringing his total number of league appearances to 13 before leaving the club.

Eintracht Frankfurt 
Osei moved to Germany and transferred to Eintracht Frankfurt in 1993, in the process joining his Ghanaian colleague, former teammate at Okwawu United and cousin Anthony Yeboah.

Caracas 
In 1996, Osei joined, Venezuelan Primera División giants Caracas F.C. playing in 1995–96 season and featuring in the Copa Libertadores for a season. He made four appearances in 1996 Copa Libertadores.

Mainz 05 
After leaving Caracas FC, Osei joined 1. FSV Mainz 05 in 1996 and in the process being in the same squad and playing alongside people like German coach Jürgen Klopp, Torsten Lieberknecht, Bruno Akrapović, and Dimo Wache. He played for the club for one season making five appearances scoring one goal in the 2. Bundesliga. He scored his only goal with the club in a match against 1. FC Lokomotive Leipzig on 6 August 1996, the match ended in a 2–1 home win. He left the club in 1997.

Later career 
Osei joined now defunct Turkish club Vanspor A.C. in 1997. After leaving Vanspor in 1998, Osei went on to play for German lower tier sides SC Weismain-Obermain for a season, Viktoria Aschaffenburg for a season, KV Mühlheim for three seasons, SV Erlenbach for two seasons and finally retiring after playing one season with Alemannia Haibach in 2006.

International career 
Osei was a member of the Ghana national team in the early 1990s whilst playing for Asante Kotoko, he received call ups into the team through the then coach Burkhard Ziese. His most notable performance for the team was playing in the 1992 African Cup of Nations qualifiers ahead of the 1992 African Cup of Nations. He played alongside players like Emmanuel Armah, Frimpong Manso, Abedi Pele and James Kwesi Appiah within that period.

Managerial career

Asante Kotoko 
Osei started his coaching career in 2012 as the assistant coach for New Edubiase United. He later joined his former club Asante Kotoko as an assistant coach to Dramani Mas-Ud Didi ahead of 2013–14 Ghanaian Premier League. That season as assistant coach, Asante Kotoko won a treble the MTN FA Cup, First Capital Plus Premier League and Super Cup. The following season David Duncan took over as coach but Osei was maintained. After a poor start to the season, Duncan was sacked in May 2016 and he was appointed as interim coach. He served in that capacity until the following season when Zdravko Logarušić was appointed as head coach and he moved back into his initial role as the assistant of the club. Two weeks after Logarušić's appointment, he parted ways with the club in January 2017. During his tenure as the head coach, he won the Ghana Presidential Cup in 2016, helped them to a fifth-place finish and the semi-finals of the FA Cup.

Liberty Professionals 
Osei joined Dansoman-based side Liberty Professionals in May 2017 on a two-year contract as head coach mid-way of the 2017 Ghana Premier league season after the club was experiencing a bad run of matches. After his appointment, the club's Director George Afriyie expressed confidence in him changing the fortunes of the club. In his first two matches Liberty picked up one point each as they were held by draws against Hearts of Oak and Tema Youth and he expressed his satisfaction with his team's performance even though they were yet to pick a win. The club subsequently placed 11th and escaped relegation by four points after winning their final match against his former club Kumasi Asante Kotoko by 2–1 with goals from club captain Samuel Sarfo and Samuel Adjei Annan. He left the club in February 2018 before the start of the 2018 Ghanaian Premier League even though he showed his excitement of coaching the club ahead of the season.

Bibiani Gold Stars 
In August 2021, after Bibiani Gold Stars gained promotion into Ghana Premier League from the Division One League for the first time in the club's history, Osei was appointed as the head coach of the club after Kobina Amissah resigned.

Outside football

Personal life 
Osei is cousins with former Ghanaian international footballer Anthony Yeboah, who he played with at Okwawu United and Eintracht Frankfurt. Yeboah is considered as one of the most prominent and prolific goal scorers in Ghanaian and African football history and gained a reputation for scoring spectacular goals.

Honours

Player 
Asante Kotoko

 Ghana Premier League: 1990–91, 1991–92
 Ghana SWAG Cup: 1990, 1991, 1992
 Ghana President's Cup: 1990

Manager 
Asante Kotoko

 Ghanaian Premier League: 2013–14

 Ghanaian FA Cup: 2014
 Ghana President's Cup: 2016
 GHALCA Top 6: 2016
Individual

 Ghana Premier League Manager of the Month: November 2022

See also 

 Asante Kotoko S.C.
 Liberty Professionals F.C.
 Dramani Mas-Ud Didi

Notes & references

Notes

References

External links 
 
 
 
 
 
 
 Bundesliga Austria profile
 Image of Michael Osei and Tony Yeboah whilst playing for Eintracht Frankfurt in 1994

Living people
1971 births
Ghanaian footballers
Ghana Premier League players
Asante Kotoko S.C. players
Asante Kotoko S.C. managers
Liberty Professionals F.C. managers
Okwawu United players
Ghanaian football managers
Association football midfielders
Ghanaian expatriate sportspeople in Austria
Ghanaian expatriate sportspeople in Germany
Ghanaian expatriate sportspeople in Turkey
Ghanaian expatriate sportspeople in Venezuela
Ghanaian expatriate footballers
Expatriate footballers in Turkey
Süper Lig players
Vanspor footballers
Expatriate footballers in Germany
Expatriate footballers in Venezuela
Expatriate footballers in Austria
1. FSV Mainz 05 players
Caracas FC players
Viktoria Aschaffenburg players
Ghana Premier League managers